Timeless was a 24-hour satellite music service of Citadel Media (through Citadel Broadcasting). It has distributed a mix of soft oldies and adult standards to radio stations around the United States. It was a combination of two former formats: gold-based adult contemporary Unforgettable Favorites (also known as "Memories") and adult standards Timeless Classics/Timeless Favorites (originally known as "Stardust"). Since 2007, it was simply known as "Timeless", still using the "Timeless Favorites" branding sparingly.

The lineup of DJs included Steve Gunn (DJ), Laurie Bandemir, Scott Reese, Debbie Douglas, Vic Thomas, and Mike Matthews on weekdays, and Steve Cumming, Frank Welch, Angie Michaels and Bob Lawrence on weekends, as well as Jack Grady.

Classic artists that were heard on Timeless include The Carpenters, Frank Sinatra, The Beatles, Barry Manilow, James Taylor, Neil Diamond, Anne Murray, Billy Joel, The Beach Boys, Linda Ronstadt, Tony Bennett, Louis Armstrong, Dionne Warwick, Elvis Presley, Carly Simon, The Bee Gees, Glen Campbell, Paul Simon and a dozen more.

History
Satellite Music Network (later taken over by ABC) started the Stardust format in 1981 in the Chicago area, and Eddie Hubbard was one of its first DJs. 
Past personalities include Jack Davis, Joe Lacina, Jerry Mitchell, Ted Ostrem, Dave Rafferty, Patty Pratt, Larry Carolla, Ron Baxley and Bud Buschardt. The name "Stardust" was taken from a 1927 song called "Stardust" composed by Hoagy Carmichael and performed by Mitchell Parish. For most of its history Stardust was an adult standards format, focusing on the big band era in its early years and evolving over the years to include more oldies and adult contemporary music. The format was called "Unforgettable Favorites" on the air for a while until ABC's Memories, another satellite format from the same company, began using the term. Stardust became "Timeless Classics" and continued to use the term until early in 2007. Among the artists who have recorded standards in recent years that were included in the format: Paul Anka, Michael Bublé, Ray Charles, Manilow, Bette Midler, Ronnie Milsap, Ronstadt, Carly Simon, John Stevens, Rod Stewart, B. J. Thomas, Jamie Cullum, Debby Boone, and Steve Tyrell.

In Summer 2006, Stardust changed to a new sound with the end of Memories, adding a number of that format's songs. The "Unforgettable Favorites" feed was still active as The Christmas Channel on a seasonal basis until 2014.

Close Down
On November 12, 2009, the staff at parent company Citadel Media says that "Timeless" was losing affiliates and became less attractive to advertisers. Citadel Media President John Rosso said it would be discontinued as of February 13, 2010.

This satellite format signed off 2 days after its scheduled date of February 13. The network signed off at 12AM Central Time on February 15, 2010. The last song played on the network was "Kind of a Drag" by The Buckinghams

Former affiliates (listed below) had the option to switch to similar services by Citadel Media, or stay on the current Oldies/Standards format provided locally or by other radio networks, or change their radio formats altogether.

Sample Hour of Programming (Stardust era, date unknown)
"I've Got You Under My Skin" – Frank Sinatra
"Georgia on My Mind" – Ray Charles
"You Light Up My Life" – Debby Boone
"The Girl From Ipanema" – Stan Getz featuring João and Astrud Gilberto
"Chances Are" – Johnny Mathis
"Hello It's Me" – Todd Rundgren
"Unforgettable" – Nat King Cole & Natalie Cole
"Copacabana" – Barry Manilow
"Cherish" – The Association
"(They Long to Be) Close to You" – The Carpenters
"How Can I Be Sure?" – The Rascals
"Mack the Knife" – Bobby Darin
"Moon River" – Andy Williams
"To Love Somebody" – The Bee Gees
"Can't Help Falling in Love" – Elvis Presley
"She's Always a Woman" – Billy Joel
"Summer Rain" – Johnny Rivers

Sample Hour of Programming (Timeless era)
"Please Baby Don't" – Sérgio Mendes with John Legend
"Only the Lonely" – Roy Orbison
"We've Only Just Begun" – The Carpenters
"I Hear a Symphony" – The Supremes
"Hello It's Me" – Todd Rundgren
"Suspicious Minds" – Elvis Presley
"Bridge over Troubled Water" – Simon & Garfunkel
"For Once in My Life" – Stevie Wonder
"Behind Closed Doors" – Charlie Rich
"Do You Know the Way to San Jose" – Dionne Warwick
"Theme from 'Love Story'" – Henry Mancini
"Rocky Mountain High" – John Denver
"Sugar, Sugar" – The Archies

Former Affiliates (prior to shut down)
Ashland, Ohio – WNCO
Batavia, New York – WBTA
Beaverton, Michigan – WMRX-FM
Burlington, Vermont – WJOY
Cape Vincent, New York (Kingston, Ontario, Canada) – WLYK
Cedar Rapids, Iowa – KMRY
Crescent City, California – KPOD
Dunedin, Florida – WHBO (new affiliate)
Ellsworth, Maine – WDEA
Fairfield Bay, Arkansas – KFFB
Flint, Michigan – WFNT
Gloucester, Virginia – WXGM
Grafton, West Virginia – WVUS
Hesperia, California – KRAK
Henderson, Kentucky - WSON
Hendersonville, North Carolina – WTZQ
Jackson, Mississippi – WLEZ-LP
Lakeland, Florida – WONN
Lansing, Michigan – WXLA
Mayfield, Kentucky – WYMC
Midland, Michigan – WMPX
Minden, Louisiana – KASO
Monroeville, Alabama – WMFC
Morehead, Kentucky – WIVY
Morris, Illinois - WCSJ/WCSJ-FM
Mount Sterling, Kentucky – WMST
Mount Vernon, Ohio – WMVO
Oakland, Maryland – WMSG
Oneonta, Alabama – WCRL
Owensboro, Kentucky – WVJS
Penn Yan, New York – WYLF
Quincy, Massachusetts - WJDA
Radford, Virginia – WRAD (new affiliate)
Red Bluff, California – KBLF
Robbins, North Carolina – WLHC
Sandusky, Ohio – WLEC
Sister Bay, Wisconsin – WSBW
Somerset, Kentucky – WTLO
Sulphur Springs, Texas – KSST
Sycamore, Illinois - WSQR
Troy, Alabama – WTBF-FM (nighttime hours only)
Van Wert, Ohio – WERT
Washington, Indiana – WAMW
Waterloo, Iowa – KWLO
Waupun, Wisconsin - WFDL
Wildwood, New Jersey – WCMC
Wolfeboro, New Hampshire – WASR
Owensboro, Kentucky - WVJS (AM)
Cannelton, Indiana - WTCJ

Competitor Networks
Music of Your Life by Planet Halo, Inc.
America's Best Music by Westwood One/Dial Global
The Lounge by Waitt Radio Networks

References

External links
Timeless – Official website

Defunct radio networks in the United States
ABC Radio Networks
Former subsidiaries of The Walt Disney Company
Radio stations established in 1981
Radio stations disestablished in 2010
Defunct radio stations in the United States